Sam Scoccia (1930 – May 12, 1996) was a Canadian Football League  defensive lineman who played 14 seasons in the CFL, mainly for the Ottawa Rough Riders, and was a member of their 1960 Grey Cup winning team. He played his first season for the Hamilton Tiger Cats in 1951, then the Saskatchewan Roughriders for 3 years, and ended his career with Ottawa. From 1952 to 1965, Scoccia played no fewer than 12 games, missing only 2 games from 1956 to 1965. He intercepted 2 passes in his career, in 1960 and 1961.

References

1930 births
1996 deaths
Canadian players of Canadian football
Canadian football offensive linemen
Hamilton Tiger-Cats players
Saskatchewan Roughriders players
Ottawa Rough Riders players